Asplanchna is a genus of rotifers belonging to the family Asplanchnidae.

The genus has cosmopolitan distribution.

Species:
 Aplanchna brightwellii Gosse, 1850 
 Aplanchna priodonta Gosse, 1850

References

Rotifer genera
Ploima